A hybrid event is a tradeshow, conference, unconference, seminar, workshop or other meeting that combines a "live" in-person event with a "virtual" online component.

With the growing popularity and cost-effectiveness of virtual events, hybrid events have become a popular way of increasing participation in traditional events at a relatively low cost. They also enable participation by people who might be unable to attend physically due to travel or time zone constraints, or through a wish to reduce the carbon footprint of the event. The open, participatory nature of unconferences (e.g., Barcamp) and their focus on sharing content, makes them hybrid events too.

Generally, the virtual component involves an online representation of the live event. For example, online participants might have access to:
 live audio or video streaming of keynote speakers or workshops alongside their presentation material
 online presentations (ranging from webcasts to sharing of content via online slide sharing websites)
 hybrid event webcast with synchronized slides alongside the live and archived webcast video presentation 
 creation of a live commentary or transcript of proceedings 
 online chat or discussion forum facilities, including audience polls or question submission
 live blogs
 event photographs and video
 integration of other social media tools

Provision of internet access, usually via free Wi-Fi, is normal at hybrid events. As well as allowing a physical event to reach a wider audience, these online tools also provide a means for physical attendees to interact with each other, with the event organisers and with online participants, and for online participants to interact with each other. Some events have featured 'TwitterWalls' where Twitter comments about the event are shared with physical attendees.

Event content can also be recorded and made available online to foster further discussions after the event has ended, build out a knowledge portal for event participants, and help market the next year's event by sharing highlights from the current year.

Examples of hybrid events
 One of the first university-level hybrid events was held in 1992, between the University of Helsinki in Finland and Williams College in the US, directed by the philosophers Esa Saarinen and Mark C. Taylor, though then defined as the first global seminar using teleconferencing technology. The book, Imagologies: Media Philosophy (1994) grew out of the seminar.
 At Barcamp events, all attendees are encouraged to share information and experiences of the event via public web channels including blogs, photo sharing, social bookmarking, Twitter, wikis, and IRC. This is a conscious change from the "off-the-record by default" and "no recordings" rules at conventional conferences.
 Run by an online community advocating use of social media or Web 2.0 to improve the built environment, Be2camp unconference events are also a practical demonstration of how the tools can be used to combine face-to-face and online participation.
 BASF has complemented a global employee summit with a virtual component. The physical event brought together IT professionals from all over the world to the BASF headquarters. Shortly after the event keynotes, workshop results, street interviews, and other materials were available for virtual participants. This virtual event lasted several months, and especially people whose tough time schedule did not allow them to participate in person were able to participate virtually.
 Cisco Live on-site conferences run concurrently with a virtual component, called Cisco Live and Networkers Virtual. Cisco Live was awarded Best Hybrid Live+Virtual Program at the 2010 Ex Awards. In addition, it was awarded the 2010 Grand Ex Award.
 Centers for Disease Control and Prevention (CDC) held the government's first hybrid event on August 21–24, 2011, with the introduction of an immersive virtual version of the Public Health Informatics conference, (an in-person event held at the Hyatt Regency Atlanta hotel). Remotely located state and local partners and public health IT colleagues were able to experience all of the plenary sessions and many other concurrent activities simultaneously with the in-person event. The event was co-sponsored by the National Association of County and City Health Officials (NACCHO) for employees, state and local groups and partners to experience activities remotely during the traditional conference - without everyone having to spend money on travel and lodging or negatively affecting the environment. The hybrid event was well received by attendees, as there were 1,865 online registrations, (after only 1 week of advertising) – with the traditional conference averaging around 1500. The hybrid event was named one of BizBash.com's 15 Most Innovative Meetings of 2012. Other Press: CDC Looks To Virtual Conferences Over Costlier Onsite Events; A Federal Case.
 BASF has complemented a global employee summit with a virtual component. The physical event brought together IT professionals from all over the world to the BASF headquarters. Shortly after the event keynotes, workshop results, street interviews, and other materials were available for virtual participants. This virtual event lasted several months, and especially people whose tough time schedule did not allow them to participate in person were able to participate virtually.
 At the ACTE conference (Association of Corporate Travel Executives) in Rome, the first virtual panel was introduced on Monday October 15, with 4 panelists live at the Waldorf Astoria and 1 panelist, subject matter expert from British Telecom, attending virtually from Brussels. The session subject titled "Finding the Balance Between Physical and Virtual Travel" and the setup was organized by GVN, The Virtual Airline (Global Videoconferencing Network)
 Visual Collab 2018 at the RSA House in London.

References

Trade fairs
Unconferences
Virtual events